Richard Steinberg may refer to:

 Richard Harold Steinberg (born 1960), former Assistant General Counsel to the U.S Trade Representative, current Professor of Law at UCLA
 Richard L. Steinberg (born 1972), former member of the Florida House of Representatives

See also
 Dick Steinberg, American football executive